A semla, vastlakukkel, laskiaispulla, Swedish eclair, fastlagsbulle/fastelavnsbolle or vēja kūkas is a traditional sweet roll made in various forms in Sweden, Finland, Norway, Denmark, the Faroe Islands, Iceland, Estonia, and Latvia, associated with Lent and especially Shrove Tuesday in most countries, Shrove Monday in Denmark, parts of southern Sweden, Iceland and Faroe Islands or Sunday of Fastelavn in Norway. "Mardi Gras bun"). In Estonia it is called . In Norway and Denmark it is called . In Faroe Islands it is called , and is served on Føstulávintsmánadagur. In Latvia, it is called .

Etymology
The name  is a loan word from German , originally deriving from the Latin , meaning 'flour', itself a borrowing from Greek σεμίδαλις (semidalis), "groats", which was the name used for the finest quality wheat flour or semolina. In the southernmost part of Sweden (Scania) and by the Swedish-speaking population in Finland, they are known as fastlagsbulle. In Scanian, the feast is also called fastelann.

Sweden/Finland 

Today, the Swedish-Finnish semla consists of a cardamom-spiced wheat bun which has its top cut off, and is then filled with a mix of milk and almond paste, topped with whipped cream. The cut-off top serves as a lid and is dusted with powdered sugar. Today it is often eaten on its own, with coffee or tea. Some prefer to eat it in a bowl of hot milk. In Finland, the bun is often filled with strawberry or raspberry jam instead of almond paste, and bakeries in Finland usually offer both versions. (Many bakeries distinguish between the two by decorating the traditional bun with almonds on top, whereas the jam-filled version has powdered sugar on top). In Finland-Swedish, semla means a plain wheat bun, used for bread and butter, and not a sweet bun. 

At some point Swedes grew tired of the strict observance of Lent, added cream and almond paste to the mix and started eating semla every Tuesday between Shrove Tuesday and Easter. Every year, at around the same time that the Swedish bakeries fill with semlor, local newspapers start to fill with semla taste tests. Panels of 'experts' dissect and inspect tables full of semlor to find the best in town.

Some bakeries have created alternative forms of the pastry, such as the "semmelwrap" formed as a wrap rather than the traditional bun, while others have added e.g. chocolate, marzipan, or pistachios to the recipe.

In Finland and Estonia the traditional dessert predates Christian influences. Laskiaissunnuntai and laskiaistiistai, both days included in laskiainen, were festivals when children and youth would go sledding or downhill sliding on a hill or a slope to determine how the crop would yield in the coming year. Those who slid the farthest were going to get the best crop. Hence the festival is named after the act of sliding or sledding downhill, laskea. Nowadays laskiainen has been integrated into Christian customs as the beginning of lent before Easter.

Norway 

Fastelavnsbolle consists of a cardamom-spiced wheat bun which has its top cut off, and is then filled with whipped cream, topped with jam. The cut-off top serves as a lid and is dusted with powdered sugar. The buns are served at Sunday of Fastelavn (Shrove Sunday), but were previously associated with Shrove Tuesday.

Denmark/Iceland/Faroe Islands
The version sold in Danish bakeries on or around Shrove Monday is rather different, made from puff pastry and filled with whipped cream, a bit of jam and often with icing on top. At home people may bake a version more similar to a usual wheat roll, mixing plain yeast dough with raisins, succade and sometimes candied bitter orange peel.

In Iceland it is done in a similar way but in place of puff pastry more common is the choux pastry version.

In Icelandic, Shrove Monday is called bolludagur (bun day), named after the pastry.

In the Faroe Islands, it is done with choux pastry, and filled with vanilla cream, whipped cream and jam, and topped with chocolate icing.

History
The oldest version of the semla was a plain bread bun, eaten in a bowl of warm milk.

The semla was originally eaten only on Shrove Tuesday, or all of the three days before Lent, as the last festive food before Lent. However, with the arrival of the Protestant Reformation, the Swedes stopped observing a strict fasting for Lent.  The semla in its bowl of warm milk became a traditional dessert every Tuesday between Shrove Tuesday and Easter. Today, semlor are available in shops and bakeries every day from shortly after Christmas until Easter. Each Swede consumes on average four to five bakery-produced semlor each year, in addition to any that are homemade.

King Adolf Frederick of Sweden died of digestion problems on February 12, 1771, after consuming 14 helpings of hetvägg (semla), the king's favorite dessert, after a meal consisting of sauerkraut, turnips, caviar, smoked herring, and champagne.

This was the sweet chosen to represent Finland in the Café Europe initiative of the Austrian presidency of the European Union, on Europe Day 2006.

See also

 Adolf Frederick, King of Sweden
 Finnish cuisine
 Swedish cuisine
 Cream bun
 List of buns
 List of pastries

References

Swedish pastries
Danish cakes
Norwegian cuisine
Finnish cuisine
Faroese cuisine
Icelandic cuisine
Estonian cuisine
Latvian cuisine
Carnival foods
Buns
Sweet breads
Stuffed desserts